Eutrypanus mucoreus is a species of longhorn beetles of the subfamily Lamiinae. It was described by Bates in 1872, and is known from eastern Mexico, Colombia, Venezuela, and Ecuador.

References

Beetles described in 1872
Acanthocinini